The 2001 Liga Indonesia Premier Division (also known as the Liga Bank Mandiri for sponsorship reasons) was the seventh season of the Liga Indonesia Premier Division, the top Indonesian professional league for association football clubs, since its formation in 1994. It began on 14 January and ended on 7 October. It was contested by 28 teams. Persija won the title after beating defending champions, PSM 3–2 in the final. RCTI provided broadcast coverage for the season.

Teams

Team changes

Relegated from Premier Division 

 Indocement Cirebon
 Medan Jaya
 PSIM
 PSIS

Promoted to Premier Division 

 Persita
 PSS
 Persikabo
 Persijap

Name changes 

 Gelora Dewata changed their name to Gelora Delta Putra following their relocation to Sidoarjo.

Stadiums and locations

First stage

West Division

East Division

Second stage

Group A

Group B

Knockout stage

Semifinals

Final

Awards

Top scorer
The following is a list of the top scorers from the 2001 season.

Best player
 Bambang Pamungkas (Persija)

References

External links
Indonesia - List of final tables (RSSSF)

Top level Indonesian football league seasons
Indonesian Premier Division seasons
1
1
Indonesia
Indonesia